Stephen Robert Anderson (born 1943) is an American linguist. He is the Dorothy R. Diebold Professor of Linguistics Emeritus at Yale University and was the 2007 president of the Linguistic Society of America.

He received a B.S. in linguistics from the Illinois Institute of Technology in 1966 and a Ph.D. in linguistics from the Massachusetts Institute of Technology in 1969. Anderson taught at Harvard University from 1969 until 1975. He joined the faculty of the University of California, Los Angeles in 1975. In 1988, he became a professor of cognitive science at Johns Hopkins University. Since 1994, he has been at Yale University; he retired from teaching in 2017. He was a Guggenheim Fellow in 1988–89. Anderson was elected a Fellow of the American Association for the Advancement of Science in 1993, the American Academy of Arts and Sciences in 1999, the Association for Psychological Science in 2006, and the Linguistic Society of America in 2008.  He was an early member of Project Steve. From 2009 to 2013 he was Vice President of CIPL, the Permanent International Committee of Linguists. In January, 2014, he was awarded the Victoria A. Fromkin Lifetime Service Award of Linguistic Society of America. A festschrift in his honor on his retirement was edited in 2017 by Claire Bowern, Laurence Horn and Raffaella Zanuttini.

Selected publications

References

External links
Stephen R. Anderson

Living people
Linguists from the United States
Morphologists
Fellows of the American Academy of Arts and Sciences
Harvard University faculty
Illinois Institute of Technology alumni
Johns Hopkins University faculty
MIT School of Humanities, Arts, and Social Sciences alumni
Yale University faculty
1943 births
Fellows of the American Association for the Advancement of Science
Linguistic Society of America presidents